Rinehart may refer to:

People
Buck Rinehart (1946–2015), American politician
Cowboy Slim Rinehart (1911–1948), American singer
Frank Rinehart (1861–1928), American artist
Gina Rinehart (born 1954), Australian businesswoman
James Rinehart (Harvard class of 1900), original subject of the "Rinehart!" call
Joyce Rinehart (also known as Joyce Anderson; 1923–2014) American woodworker, furniture designer
Mary Roberts Rinehart (1876–1958), American novelist
Ron Rinehart (born 1965), American singer
Terry London Rinehart, American aviator
William Henry Rinehart (1825–1874), American sculptor
William V. Rinehart (1835–1918), U.S. military officer, government official, and businessman

Publishing companies
Holt, Rinehart and Winston, American publishing company
Farrar & Rinehart, American publishing company
Rinehart & Company, American publishing company

Places
Rinehart, Missouri, a community in the United States
Rinehart, West Virginia, a community in the United States

Others
"Rinehart" (Harvard), a Harvard call
Rinehart, a character in Ralph Ellison's Invisible Man

See also
Reinhart
Reinhardt (disambiguation)
Reinhard